Alexander Raphael Bowen Smith (born 3 April 1993) is a Panamanian athlete specialising in the high jump. He won a bronze medal at the 2015 South American Championships.

His personal bests in the event are  outdoors (Binghamton, NY 2013) and  indoors (Boston 2013).

International competitions

References

1993 births
Living people
Athletes (track and field) at the 2018 South American Games
Panamanian expatriate sportspeople in the United States
Panamanian high jumpers
Central American Games gold medalists for Panama
Central American Games medalists in athletics
South American Championships in Athletics winners
Competitors at the 2018 Central American and Caribbean Games